Li Mo'an (1904–2001) was a Kuomintang general from Changsha, Hunan.

Military career
From 1928 he was the commanding officer of the 31st Brigade. He became the Fujian Second Pacification Area commander in 1935. He was the general commanding officer of various forces from 1935 to 1941, including the 10th Division (1935-1937), 15th Army (1937-1938), 33rd Army (1938-1940), and the Hunan-Hubei-Jianxi Border Area army (1940-1941). In 1940-41 he was also deputy commander-in-chief of the 14th, 26th and 38th Army Groups. He became commander-in-chief of the 32nd Army Group (1944), and later the 3rd Front Army (1946). In 1948 he was made commander of the Changsha Seventhen Pacification Area. He retired from the army in 1949.

Later life
In 1984 Li Mo'an was the co-founder of the Whampoa Military Academy Alumni Association, and he became the association's Director in 1995.

References

National Revolutionary Army generals from Hunan
1904 births
2001 deaths
Politicians from Changsha
People's Republic of China politicians from Hunan